Alan is a commune in the Haute-Garonne department in southwestern France.

Geography
The commune is bordered by seven other communes: Bachas to the north, Terrebasse to the northeast, Marignac-Laspeyres to the east, Le Fréchet to the south, Aurignac to the southwest, Montoulieu-Saint-Bernard to the west, and finally by Benque to the northwest.

History
The village was established in the 11th century as a sauveté by the Knights of St John.  In the 13th century (1272), it was transformed into a bastide by Eustache de Beaumarchais.  Shortly afterwards Bertrand de Miramont, Bishop of the Comminges, established a residence there, expanded by subsequent bishops to become their winter palace.  The Bishops of Comminges ruled Alan without a feudal system, but with the peasants paying their tax to the church.  In 1498, the county of Comminges passed to the King of France and taxes were collected by the  Estates of Comminges (a type of local parliament).  After the French revolution, the palace and its gardens were declared national property and divided into eleven parts. Gradually these fell into disuse and the building was abandoned in the 19th century, although it has been extensively restored by recent owners.

An earlier text dates the establishment of Alan, Haute-Garonne and its name back to the fifth century AD during the reign of Constantius III and his campaigns against the Visigoths in northern Hispania. In Year 414 AD, the forces of Visigothic King Athaulf along with their Alan allies were marching into southern Gaul in search of a place to settle, having gained control of Narbonne, Toulouse and Bordeaux before facing a stalemate at Bazas. At that point, Count Paulinus of Pella, who happened to a friend of the Alan leader, and who was inside the besieged town with his family, managed to persuade the Alan chiefs to break off from Visigoths and help successfully break the siege of Bazas, and in exchange Paulinus promised the Alans land on which to settle. The Goths, deprived of their Alan allies broke off the siege and through constant pressure by forces of Constantius, fled from southern Gaul, crossing the Pyrenees and entering Hispania in 415 AD. Following this victory, emperor Constantius, as part of his plan to confine the Goths in Hispania, fulfilled the agreement between Paulinus and the Alans, arranging for the division of land between Toulouse and the Mediterranean, enabling the Alans to control coastal roads particularly the Via Domitia connecting Gaul with Hispania. In this area, Alan millitary settlers or their decendants appear to have given their name to the towns including Alan but also Alénya, Alaigne and Lanet.

Population

The inhabitants of the commune are called Alanais.

See also
Communes of the Haute-Garonne department

References

Communes of Haute-Garonne